Heliophanus berlandi is a species of jumping spider in the genus Heliophanus that lives in South Africa. The female was first described in 1937.

References

Endemic fauna of South Africa
Spiders described in 1937
Salticidae
Spiders of South Africa